There are 137 movie theaters and 31 arthouse cinemas in the Netherlands, with a total of ca. 675 screens, in addition to 79 small arthouse cinemas and a number of adult movie theaters. The main movie theater chains in the Netherlands are Pathé, VUE and Kinepolis.

Pathé 

Pathé Theatres B.V. is part of the EuroPalaces movie theater chain with 75 movie theaters with 730 screens (2004), mainly in France, which in turn is part of Pathé. Pathé Theatres B.V. operates a chain of theaters (most multiplex) in the Netherlands:
Pathé Amersfoort in Amersfoort (8 screens)
Pathé Arena in Amsterdam (14 screens)
Pathé City in Amsterdam (7 screens)
Pathé de Munt in Amsterdam (13 screens)
Pathé Tuschinski in Amsterdam (6 screens)
Pathé Rembrandt Arnhem in Arnhem (5 screens)
Pathé Breda in Breda (7 screens)
Pathé Delft in Delft (7 screens)
Pathé Buitenhof in The Hague (6 screens)
Pathé Scheveningen in The Hague (8 screens)
Pathé Spuimarkt in The Hague (9 screens)
Pathé Eindhoven in Eindhoven (8 screens)
Pathé Groningen in Groningen (9 screens)
Pathé Haarlem in Haarlem (8 screens)
Pathé Helmond in Helmond (5 screens)
Pathé Maastricht in Maastricht (6 screens)
Pathé de Kuip in Rotterdam (14 screens)
Pathé Schouwburgplein in Rotterdam (7 screens)
Pathé Tilburg in Tilburg (7 screens)
Pathé Rembrandt Utrecht in Utrecht (3 screens)
Pathé Zaandam in Zaandam (6 screens)
Pathé De Kroon in Zwolle (4 screens)

The largest theaters are Pathé de Munt in the center of Amsterdam (13 screens), Pathé Arena in Amsterdam-Zuidoost (14 screens), and Pathé de Kuip in Rotterdam (14 screens). A Wolff theater with 18 screens will arise in Utrecht, at the Jaarbeurs-side (westside) of Utrecht Centraal railway station. Using Wolff's definition of a megaplex theater, one having 16 or more screens, it will be the first one in the Netherlands.

Pathé sells the Pathé Unlimited Card (PUC) for unlimited entrance to regular showings at all its Dutch theaters for €21 per month (or €29,50 per month including 3D, 4DX, Dolby Cinema and IMAX). The Cineville Pass allows unlimited entrance to regular and most of the special showings at about 40 independent movie theaters in the Netherlands, in Alkmaar, Amersfoort, Amsterdam, Arnhem, Castricum, Den Haag, Deventer, Dordrecht, Groningen, Haarlem, Hilversum, Leiden, Maastricht, Nijmegen, Rotterdam, Schiedam, Utrecht, Wageningen and Zwolle for €21 per month (and a discounted rate of €17,50 for those under 30) . Some Pathé theaters and independent cinema's offer live broadcasting of operas and some concerts. Admission prices are two or three times the regular ones.

IMAX 

There are also seven IMAX theaters in the Netherlands, six of which belong to Pathé.
Omniversum, The Hague - IMAX Dome
Pathé Arena, Amsterdam - IMAX Laser 3D
Pathé Eindhoven, Eindhoven - IMAX Digital 3D
Pathé Schouwburgplein, Rotterdam - IMAX Laser 3D
Pathé Spuimarkt, The Hague - IMAX Laser 3D
Pathé Tilburg, Tilburg - IMAX Digital 3D
Pathé Arnhem, Arnhem - IMAX Digital 3D

Table of movie theaters in the Netherlands

See also
Cinema of the Netherlands

Notes and references

External links

Movie theaters in the Netherlands (PDF)
Cinema program in the Netherlands
 Cinema Context: an encyclopedia of cinemas in the Netherlands from 1896 (Dutch and English)
 upcoming releases in the Netherlands

Cinemas and movie theaters in the Netherlands
Entertainment companies of the Netherlands

nl:Bioscoop